Plaza Hollywood is a large shopping centre in Diamond Hill, Kowloon, Hong Kong. It is part of Galaxia, a residential estate of Wharf Holdings.

The shopping centre opened in 1997, and includes four levels surrounding a central atrium. It has more than 220 shops, a large supermarket, food court, restaurants and cinema. It is themed after Hollywood in the United States.

Location and history 
The shopping centre was located formerly the part of Tai Hom Village squatter areas, it began to develop into a residential and shopping centre after the demolition of squatter area in mid-1990s.

Surrounded by Fung Tak Road, Lung Poon Street, Tai Hom Road and Sheung Yuen Street. It near Diamond Hill MTR station, and next to Lung Cheung Road, which is one of the main trunk roads in Hong Kong.

The complex was developed by Wharf (Holdings), Wheelock Properties, and Hongkong Realty and Trust.

Architectural design 
Plaza Hollywood by the related product concept in United States, hope to bring the colorful shopping experience to customers. Its large atrium "Star Plaza" was located in the center of the shopping centre, construction area near 10,000 square feet, the large scale which is rare in other shopping centres among in Kowloon East.

Like the Avenue of Stars, the Stars Atrium on the first floor has the names of 60 Hong Kong celebrities who received awards from Hong Kong Film Awards set into star shapes floor tiles. The roof of the atrium is covered with brightly-coloured polygon stained glass.

Facilities
There is a public underground transport interchange, providing multiple bus and minibus routes were between the major housing estates in Hong Kong and Wong Tai Sin district.

There had the entrances and exits in Diamond Hill MTR station, facilitate the public to use the MTR system to getting around Hong Kong. In addition, there had travel agencies also has a branch in the ground floor.

The main attraction of this shopping centre is the Stars Atrium. It is often home to many promotional features, including the 1 vs. 100 feature during the month of August in 2006. It also features a large LED screen.

Each levels were connected by multiple sets of escalators and air-conditioning systems, providing a comfortable shopping environment to the customers. The fourth floor was the attic, which including the sales office of the shopping centre, cinemas and restaurants, all of which are independently connected via the elevator of third floor.

Stores
Plaza Hollywood has boutiques everywhere, there has multiple brands under i.t.'s.

Level 1 is where the large fashion apparel and jewelry stores are concentrated.

Level 2 is mainly for skin care, cosmetics, clothing, home appliances and telecoms shops.

Level 3 has restaurants, as well as the cinema, and children's clothing and household personal care stores.

There are over 30 restaurants, including Pizza Hut and Wing Wah.
It also has over 100 clothing, electronics, and retail stores.

Transport
Plaza Hollywood is served by:
 MTR Diamond Hill station (Exit C2)
 Bus
 GMB
 Taxis
 Car park spaces

See also
 Hollywood Hong Kong, a 2001 Hong Kong film directed by Fruit Chan, is set in Tai Hom Village, and makes references to Plaza Hollywood.
 Wong Tung & Partners

References

External links

 

1997 establishments in Hong Kong
Buildings and structures completed in 1997
Shopping centres in Hong Kong
Tai Hom
The Wharf (Holdings)